Urothemis thomasi, the Omani dragonfly, is a species of dragonfly in the family Libellulidae. It is found in Oman and possibly Somalia, and was recently discovered in the United Arab Emirates. Its natural habitats are rivers and freshwater springs. It was last known to be threatened by habitat loss as of 2014.

References

Libellulidae
Taxonomy articles created by Polbot
Insects described in 1932